Systema Engineering is a Japanese manufacturer of airsoft internal parts, and airsoft gun replicas of real firearms for use as a safe, low cost substitute in simulated live fire training.

Products

M16A1
M16A2
M16A3
M16A3 Burst
M16A4
M4A1
M4A1 CQBR
M4 Burst
M733 Limited Edition
PTW89 (Based on Howa Type 89)
PTW5A4 (Based on HK MP5A4)

References

External links
 Systema PTW User Group, PTW User Group.
 Systema MIL/LE PTW SHOT SHOW 2009, 2009 Shot Show Interview MIL/LE Product.
 Systema PTW Club, Thailand User Group, Systema PTW Thailand User Group.
 Systema PTW Club, Russian User Group, Systema PTW Russian User Group.

Airsoft
Manufacturing companies of Japan